Brett James McMullen is a retired brigadier general in the United States Air Force. He joined the Air Force as an enlisted serviceman in 1981, and received a commission as a second lieutenant in 1985. He worked his way up through the ranks, finally obtaining the rank of brigadier general on April 3, 2014. He retired as  the Mobilization Assistant to the Deputy Assistant Secretary of the Air Force for Contracting, Office of the Assistant Secretary of the Air Force for Acquisition. His responsibilities included all contracting for the Air Force, including weapon systems, logistical support, and all other forms of operational support.

References

United States Air Force generals
Year of birth missing (living people)
Living people